Aditi Bhatia (born 29 October 1999) is an Indian actress and model known for playing Ruhi Bhalla in Star Plus's Yeh Hai Mohabbatein.

Early life and education
Bhatia completed her intermediate studies from the Maharashtra State Board of Secondary and Higher Secondary Education in 2018.

Career
Bhatia started off her career as a child actor, having featured in the advertisements followed by various films like Vivah, Shootout at Lokhandwala, The Train, Chance Pe Dance and Sargoshiyan.

In 2015, Bhatia played Bubbly Taneja in Zee TV's Tashan-e-Ishq. From 2016 to 2019, she portrayed Adult Ruhi Bhalla in Star Plus's Ye Hai Mohabbatein after Ruhanika Dhawan. She also participated in Colors TV's Comedy Nights Bachao Taaza. In 2018, she joined Comedy Circus. In 2019, Bhatia appeared in Colors TV's Khatra Khatra Khatra.

Filmography

Films

Television

Music videos

References

External links

 
 

1999 births
Living people
Indian television actresses
21st-century Indian actresses